Rebecca Richards-Kortum (born April 14, 1964) is an American bioengineer and the Malcolm Gillis University Professor at Rice University.  She is a professor in the departments of Bioengineering and Electrical and Computer Engineering, and she is the Director of Rice 360°: Institute for Global Health, and the Founder of Beyond Traditional Borders. She is the Director of the Institute of Biosciences and Bioengineering, and serves as the advisor to the Provost on health-related research.

Richards-Kortum is the recipient of the Pierre Galletti Award, the highest honor from the American Institute for Medical and Biological Engineering (AIMBE), for her contributions to global health care and bioengineering technology.

Early life 
Richards-Kortum grew up in Grand Island, Nebraska. She enjoyed math and science in elementary school and attended University of Nebraska-Lincoln after high school. Due to a dearth of women mentors and role models, she initially aspired to be a high school math and science teacher upon her graduation. Her trajectory changed after graduating with highest distinction in physics and mathematics, when she considered PhD programs after being exposed to undergraduate research. She attended  Massachusetts Institute of Technology and received a master's degree in physics in 1987 and a doctorate in medical physics in 1990.

Career and research 
Richards-Kortum began her academic career at The University of Texas in the electrical and computer engineering department, where she rose through the ranks from assistant, to associate, to full professor. She then joined the faculty of bioengineering at Rice University, earning the rank of University Professor, which means she can teach in any academic department and across disciplines.

Richards-Kortum specializes in creating new technologies to provide health care to vulnerable populations, including methods for diagnosis of cancers, methods for treating jaundice in newborns, and a bubble continuous positive airway pressure machine for premature infants unable to breathe on their own.

Publications
She is the author of the textbook Biomedical Engineering for Global Health (Cambridge University Press, 2010) and the author or co-author of over 315 research papers, 13 book chapters, and 40 patents.

Honors and awards 
In recognition of her work, Richards-Kortum received a MacArthur Fellowship in 2016.  She was elected to the National Academy of Engineering in 2008 and the National Academy of Sciences and the American Academy of Arts and Sciences in 2015.

In 2016 she received the Pierre Galletti Award, the highest honor from the American Institute for Medical and Biological Engineering (AIMBE), for her contributions to global health care and bioengineering technology. In her Pierre Galletti address to the AIMBE, she noted that the biggest career-transition gender disparity occurs at the graduate student/postdoc-to-assistant professor step, and she challenged the leaders in bioengineering to encourage women to pursue academic positions, especially at the "20th mile" of the academic "marathon."

She was elected to the American Philosophical Society in 2017.

In 2014 Richards-Kortum was awarded the Michael S. Feld Biophotonics Award from The Optical Society for her "exceptional contributions to advancing the applications of optics in disease diagnosis and inspiring work in disseminating low-cost health technologies to the developing world."

In 2008, she was named a Howard Hughes Medical Institute Professor and received a grant for the undergraduate global health program at Rice. This program won the science prize for Inquiry-Based Instruction from Science magazine and the Lemelson-MIT Award Global Innovation.

Rebecca Richards-Kortum has received more grants than any other Rice University Professor.

References

1964 births
Living people
American bioengineers
Rice University faculty
Women bioengineers
21st-century American scientists
21st-century American women scientists
MacArthur Fellows
Fellows of the American Institute for Medical and Biological Engineering
Members of the United States National Academy of Engineering
Members of the United States National Academy of Sciences
Fellows of the American Academy of Arts and Sciences
Members of the American Philosophical Society
People from Grand Island, Nebraska
Fellows of Optica (society)
Senior Members of the IEEE
Women in optics
American women academics
University of Nebraska–Lincoln alumni